Palmar digital arteries may refer to:

 Common palmar digital arteries
 Proper palmar digital arteries